Kalagolla is a village in Sri Lanka. It is located within Uva Province.

See also
List of settlements in Uva Province

External links

Populated places in Uva Province